Curtis Brooks (born February 6, 1998) is an American football defensive tackle for the Tennessee Titans of the National Football League (NFL). He played college football at Cincinnati.

Professional career

Indianapolis Colts
Brooks was drafted by the Indianapolis Colts with the 216th pick in the sixth round of the 2022 NFL Draft. He was waived on August 30, 2022 and signed to the practice squad the next day. He was released on December 19.

Tennessee Titans
On January 4, 2023, Brooks was signed to the Tennessee Titans practice squad. He signed a reserve/future contract on January 10, 2023.

References

External links
 Indianapolis Colts bio
  Cincinnati Bearcats bio

Living people
1998 births
American football defensive tackles
Cincinnati Bearcats football players
Indianapolis Colts players
Players of American football from Virginia
Sportspeople from Danville, Virginia
Tennessee Titans players